Bet ng Bayan is a 2014 Philippine television reality talent show broadcast by GMA Network. Hosted by Regine Velasquez and Alden Richards, it premiered on October 5, 2014 replacing Sa Puso ni Dok. The show concluded on December 28, 2014 with a total of 13 episodes.

Contestants 
Singing
Luzon: Renz Robosa and Katherine Castillo
Mega Manila: Veronica Atienza and Apple Delleva
Visayas: Alma Sumagaysay and Hannah Precillas
Mindanao: Sherwin Baguion and Keirulf Raboy

Dancing
Luzon: Boyz Unlimited and UNEP Dance Club
Mega Manila: Names Going Wild and A's Crew
Visayas: Capa-DS and Don Juan
Mindanao: Black Sheep and D'Gemini

Unique talent
Luzon: Jason Ivan Sobremonte and John Kim Belangel
Mega Manila: Techno Jazz and Ian Adriano
Visayas: Master of Pain and Karinyoso Boys
Mindanao: John Carlo Moneral and Jomar Abjelina

Elimination chart

Ratings
According to AGB Nielsen Philippines' Mega Manila household television ratings, the pilot episode of Bet ng Bayan earned a 14.7% rating. While the final episode scored a 14.3% rating.

Accolades

References 

2014 Philippine television series debuts
2014 Philippine television series endings
Filipino-language television shows
GMA Network original programming
Philippine reality television series